Lester Poe Dittemore (June 27, 1886 – December 19, 1966) was an American football player and coach. He served as the head football coach at Alfred University in Alfred, New York in 1911 compiling a record of 2–2.

Head coaching record

References

1886 births
1966 deaths
Alfred Saxons athletic directors
Alfred Saxons football coaches
Central Missouri Mules football players
Springfield College (Massachusetts) alumni
People from Buchanan County, Missouri
Coaches of American football from Missouri
Players of American football from Missouri